The 1978 All Ireland Camogie Championship was won by Cork, who beat Dublin by 17 points in the final. It was the last final to be played using the second crossbar.

Championship
Margaret O'Toole scored the goal to bring Clare into the All-Ireland semi-final for the second successive year and third time in all.

Semi-final
Dublin’s superior ground play and first half goals from Anne Byrne and Mary Mernagh proved decisive in a semi-final victory over Wexford played in torrential rain.

Final
Cork scored three goals (from Sheila Murray, Nancy O'Driscoll and Pat Moloney) and two points without reply in the opening twenty minutes, ending the game as a contest. Cork added two goals late in the second half when Dublin showed signs of recovering. Sean Kilfeather wrote in the Irish Times:
Dublin were left with a completely hopeless task after only 20 minutes, by which time Cork had scored three goals and two points, without reply. By half-time Cork had added another goal and Dublin were still scoreless. The second half saw Dublin put up a plucky fright and we were left wondering why they were so ineffective earlier. Had Dublin adopted different tactics from the start, they would scarcely have been outscored to the extent of 17 points.
Agnes Hourigan wrote in the Irish Press: In many years watching Cork camogie teams I do not think I have seen one play better than yesterday. Cork, for whom nothing could go wrong yesterday, were obviously far the superior side from the start, the game was always entertaining, even though it lacked a real competitive element. All through it was a delight t watch the speed style, and skill of such long serving Corkonians as Pat Moloney and full back Marie Costine.
Mary Geaney was an Ireland women's field hockey international and officials of the Irish Ladies Hockey Union attended the match as guests. Nancy O'Driscoll was the first player to have captained Cork at two different grades.

Final stages

Final

MATCH RULES
50 minutes
Replay if scores level
Maximum of 3 substitutions

See also
 All-Ireland Senior Hurling Championship
 Wikipedia List of Camogie players
 National Camogie League
 Camogie All Stars Awards
 Ashbourne Cup

References

External links
 Official Camogie website
 History of Camogie senior championship slideshow. presented by Cumann Camógaíochta Communications Committee at GAA Museum January 25, 2010 part one, part two, part three and part four
 Historic newspaper reports of All Ireland finals
 Camogie on official GAA website
 Timeline: History of Camogie
 Camogie on GAA Oral History Project
 Camogie Websites for Antrim and Dublin

1978
1978
All-Ireland Senior Camogie Championship
All-Ireland Senior Camogie Championship
All-Ireland Senior Camogie Championship
All-Ireland Senior Camogie Championship